The Latner Writers' Trust Poetry Prize is a Canadian literary award. Presented by the Writers' Trust of Canada and the Latner Family Foundation, the award presents $25,000 annually to a Canadian poet who has published at least three collections, to honour their body of work.

Announced in April 2014, the award was presented for the first time on November 4. Its inaugural jury consisted of poets Stephanie Bolster, Lorna Crozier and Fred Wah.

Winners
2014 - Ken Babstock
2015 - Karen Solie
2016 - Gregory Scofield
2017 - Louise Bernice Halfe
2018 - Jordan Scott
2019 - Stephen Collis
2020 - Armand Garnet Ruffo
2021 - Weyman Chan
2022 - Joseph Dandurand

References

Writers' Trust of Canada awards
Canadian poetry awards
Awards established in 2014
2014 establishments in Canada